Anna Krien is an Australian journalist, essayist, fiction and nonfiction writer and poet.

Career 
Krien has contributed to a number of Australian publications, including The Monthly, The Age, The Big Issue, The Best Australian Essays, Griffith Review, Voiceworks, Going Down Swinging, Colors, Frankie and Dazed & Confused.

Krien has written poetry for a number of years. Her  poem, "The Last Broadcasters", won the 2008 Val Vallis Award and "Horses" was included in The Best Australian Poems 2010. 

In 2014 she became only the second woman to win the £25,000 (A$47,000) William Hill Sports Book of the Year award since its inception 1989.

Krien has written two contributions to the Quarterly Essay — "Us & Them: On the Importance of Animals" and "The Long Goodbye: Coal, Coral and Australia's Climate Deadlock". In 2019 she joined the judging panel for the Horne Prize. As of 2019 she was based in Melbourne, Victoria.

Awards and recognition 
Krien was a recipient of a Sidney Myer Creative Fellowship, an award of  given to mid-career creatives and thought leaders.

 Winner, Val Vallis Award, 2008
Winner, People's Choice Award, Victorian Premier's Literary Awards, 2011, for Into the Woods

 Shortlisted, Victorian Premier's Prize for Nonfiction, 2011, for Into the Woods

 Winner, Harry Williams Award for a Literary Work Advancing Public Debate, Queensland Premier's Literary Awards, 2011, for Into the Woods

 Winner, William Hill Sports Book of the Year, 2014, for Night Games

 Shortlisted, Stella Prize, 2014, for Night Games

 Winner, Davitt Award for True Crime, 2014, for Night Games

 Shortlisted, Victorian Premier's Prize for Fiction, 2020, for Act of Grace
Longlisted, Miles Franklin Award, 2020, for Act of Grace
Shortlisted, Queensland Literary Awards, Fiction Book Award, 2020, for Act of Grace

Publications

Nonfiction 

 Into the Woods: The Battle for Tasmania's Forests, Black Inc, 2010 

 Night Games: Sex, Power and Sport, Black Inc, 2013 

 Booze Territory, Black Inc, 2015

Fiction 

 Act of Grace, Black Inc, 2019

References 

Living people
Year of birth missing (living people)
Australian women journalists
Australian women essayists
Australian essayists
Australian women poets
Australian women novelists
21st-century Australian journalists
21st-century essayists
21st-century Australian poets
21st-century Australian novelists